Dragan Dobrić (born 11 March 1986) is a Croatian football striker playing for Vihor Maljurevac.

Club career
Born in Osijek, SR Croatia, back in Yugoslavia, Dragan Dobrić spent most of his career in Serbia. He played with the youth team of OFK Beograd. He made his debut as senior during the second half of the 2004–05 season when he played with FK BSK Borča. Borča is located in Belgrade's municipality of Palilula, and in summer 2005 Dobrić moved to BSK rivals within the municipality, FK Palilulac Beograd where he stayed for the following three seasons playing in the Serbian League Belgrade.  In summer 2008 he was brought by top-tier side FK Hajduk Kula.  The competition at Hajduk attack that season was tough, they included strikers like Filip Kasalica, Nikola Komazec, Aleksandar Davidov or Zoran Rajović, so at the end of the season Dobrić made two appearances in the 2008–09 Serbian SuperLiga and he was loaned to his former club Palilulac for the next season. Next, he played with FK Dinamo Vranje in the first half of the 2010–11 Serbian First League while the rest of the season he played with FK Srem Jakovo.  In summer 2011 he joined a club from the Croatian part of Bosnia and Herzegovina, NK GOŠK Gabela, which had just been promoted to the Bosnian highest level after winning the 2010–11 First League of the Federation of Bosnia and Herzegovina, one of two Bosnian second tiers, the Bosniak and Croat one.  Dobrić made three appearances with GOŠK in the first half of the 2011–12 Premier League of Bosnia and Herzegovina and during the winter-break he returned to Serbia and joined third-level side FK Resnik playing in the Serbian League Belgrade. Next summer he moved to a club from same league, FK PKB Padinska Skela.

References

1986 births
Living people
Footballers from Osijek
Serbs of Croatia
Croatian emigrants to Serbia
Association football forwards
Croatian footballers
Serbian footballers
FK BSK Borča players
FK Palilulac Beograd players
FK Hajduk Kula players
FK Dinamo Vranje players
FK Srem Jakovo players
NK GOŠK Gabela players
FK Resnik players
FK Crvenka players
Serbian SuperLiga players
Serbian First League players